The Rushton Clinic is a historic medical office at 219 North Washington Street in Magnolia, Arkansas.  Built in 1938, it is an excellent local example of Art Moderne style.  It is a single-story structure, roughly U-shaped, with walls of buff brick and stone or cast concrete coping.  Glass blocks are used for accent on the corners and around the door.  It was built for Dr. Joe Rushton, who had recently graduated from medical school and sought to establish a practice in the city.  He practiced out of this building until his death in 1983.

The building was listed on the U.S. National Register of Historic Places in 2013 for its architecture.

See also
 Dr. John William Morris Clinic: NRHP-listed in Woodruff County, Arkansas
 National Register of Historic Places listings in Columbia County, Arkansas

References

Commercial buildings on the National Register of Historic Places in Arkansas
Commercial buildings completed in 1938
National Register of Historic Places in Columbia County, Arkansas
1938 establishments in Arkansas
Clinics in the United States
Healthcare in Arkansas
Art Moderne architecture in Arkansas
Magnolia, Arkansas